In enzymology, an indole-3-acetaldehyde oxidase is an enzyme that catalyzes the chemical reaction

(indol-3-yl)acetaldehyde + H2O + O2  (indol-3-yl)acetate + H2O2

The 3 substrates of this enzyme are (indol-3-yl)acetaldehyde, H2O, and O2, whereas its two products are (indol-3-yl)acetate and H2O2.

This enzyme belongs to the family of oxidoreductases, specifically those acting on the aldehyde or oxo group of donor with oxygen as acceptor.  The systematic name of this enzyme class is (indol-3-yl)acetaldehyde:oxygen oxidoreductase. Other names in common use include indoleacetaldehyde oxidase, IAAld oxidase, AO1, and indole-3-acetaldehyde:oxygen oxidoreductase.  This enzyme participates in tryptophan metabolism.  It has 3 cofactors: FAD, Heme,  and Molybdenum.

References

 
 
 
 
 
 
 

EC 1.2.3
Flavoproteins
Heme enzymes
Molybdenum enzymes
Enzymes of unknown structure